Gong Maoxin and Yi Chu-huan were the defending champions but chose to defend their title with different partners. Gong partnered Zhang Ze but lost in the quarterfinals to Ruben Gonzales and Hsieh Cheng-peng. Yi partnered Yuya Kibi but withdrew from the tournament due to a Kibi injury.

Sanchai and Sonchat Ratiwatana won the title after defeating Ruben Bemelmans and Joris De Loore 4–6, 6–4, [10–7] in the final.

Seeds

Draw

References
 Main Draw

Shimadzu All Japan Indoor Tennis Championships - Doubles
All Japan Indoor Tennis Championships